Jeanne-Caroline Augusta Violet Dussap (1 February 1870 in Paris – 26 June 1951 in Mayenne) was a French writer who wrote under the pseudonym of Guy Chantepleure or Guy de Chantepleure. She is best remembered for her novel Ma conscience en robe rose (1895), which was awarded a Montyon Prize in 1896.

References 

1870 births
1951 deaths
19th-century French writers
19th-century French women writers
20th-century French writers
20th-century French women writers
Pseudonymous writers
Pseudonymous women writers
19th-century pseudonymous writers
20th-century pseudonymous writers